Pochtovo-Telegrafnyi Zhurnal (Post and Telegraph Journal) was an official magazine of the Russian postal authorities between 1888 and 1919.

History 
The magazine was published in St. Petersburg from 1888 to 1916  by the Chief Directorate of Posts and Telegraphs of the Russian Empire. In 1917, it was issued in Petrograd by the Ministry of Posts and Telegraphs of the Russian Provisional Government.

In 1918 and 1919, Pochtovo-Telegrafnyi Zhurnal became the official organ of the People's Commissariat for Posts and Telegraphs of the RSFSR and was published in Moscow.

Content 
Pochtovo-Telegrafnyi Zhurnal had two sections, official and unofficial. The official section contained:
 orders,
 directives,
 postal rates,
 other departmental materials.

The unofficial section included articles on the history and state of the postal, telegraph, and telephone services in Russia.

In 1888–1892, two sections were printed together and 24 times a year. Later on, the official section appeared weekly, whereas the unofficial section was published monthly.

See also 
 A.S. Popov Central Museum of Communications
 Filateliya
 Kollektsioner
 List of philatelic magazines
 People's Commissariat for Posts and Telegraphs of the RSFSR
 Postage stamps and postal history of Russia
 Soviet Philatelist
 The Post Office Electrical Engineers' Journal

References

1888 establishments in the Russian Empire
1919 disestablishments in Russia
Biweekly magazines
Defunct magazines published in Russia
Magazines established in 1888
Magazines disestablished in 1919
Magazines published in Moscow
Magazines published in Saint Petersburg
Philatelic periodicals
Postal history of Russia
Russian-language magazines
Monthly magazines published in Russia
Weekly magazines published in Russia
Magazines published in the Soviet Union